The 2021 Asian Youth Games or AYG 2021, officially the 3rd Asian Youth Games and commonly as Shantou 2021, is a cancelled multi-sport event which was intended to be held in Shantou, Guangdong, China in 2022.

Originally planned as the fourth Games, the Olympic Council of Asia then decided to postpone the third Asian Youth Games from 2017 to 2021. Due to the ongoing COVID-19 pandemic, in September 2021, the Games were postponed till December 2022, similar to 2021 Southeast Asian Games.

The Games were officially cancelled on 6 May 2022 due to the COVID-19 pandemic.

History 
On 8 November 2012, the Olympic Council of Asia awarded the 2021 Asian Youth Games hosting rights to Surabaya, Indonesia. Surabaya was an unsuccessful bidder for the then-2018 Asian Games when they were defeated by Hanoi, Vietnam. After Jakarta and Palembang was awarded the 2018 Asian Games in the second host selection due to Hanoi withdrawal, the right of 2021 Asian Youth Games awarded to Surabaya was rejected.

The 2017 Asian Youth Games (AYG) were to be an international multi-sport event. Initially planned to be hosted by the city of Hambantota, Sri Lanka.  A new host for the 2017 AYG, however, was to be decided at a future Olympic Council of Asia general assembly after Sri Lanka lost its hosting rights.  Sri Lanka had been stripped of its hosting rights by the OCA due to political interference of its national Olympic committee by the government.  Sri Lanka's replacement was set to be decided at an OCA general assembly scheduled in September 2015.  Indonesia was initially offered by the OCA to take over as hosts and the games were suggested as a test event for the 2018 Asian Games, but it was decided to postpone the event until 2021 as no replacement host city was found.

On 3 March 2019, the Olympic Council of Asia awarded the hosting rights to Shantou during the 38th OCA General Assembly in Bangkok, Thailand, after Shantou was the only city to declare the candidacy.

Sports
The following 18 sports are part of these Games:

 
 Aquatics

See also
2010 Asian Games held in Guangzhou, Guangdong
2021 Asian Beach Games held in Sanya, Hainan
2022 Asian Games held in Hangzhou, Zhejiang

Notes

References

External links
  

Asian Youth Games
Sports competitions in Guangdong
Asian Youth Games
Multi-sport events in China
Youth sport in China
Asian Youth Games